Bronson Canyon, or Bronson Caves, is a section of Griffith Park in Los Angeles that has become known as a filming location for many films and television series, especially Westerns and science fiction, from the early days of motion pictures to the present.

Location and history
Bronson Canyon is located in the southwest section of Griffith Park near the north end of Canyon Drive, which is an extension of Bronson Avenue. In 1903, the Union Rock Company founded a quarry, originally named Brush Canyon, for excavation of crushed rock used in the construction of city streets–carried out of the quarry by electric train on the Brush Canyon Line. The quarry ceased operation in the late 1920s, leaving the caves behind. The caves became known as the Bronson Caves after the nearby avenue and a hill of that name, giving the area its more popular name of Bronson Canyon. The same street may have indirectly provided the stage name for actor Charles Bronson, as the former Charles Buchinsky is believed to have chosen that name in 1954 after seeing it on a street sign in Hollywood.

The craggy quarry remains pockmarked by what appear to be cave openings create an ideal backdrop for filming scenes meant to take place in a lonely southwestern wilderness.  Scenes of the main cave entrance are normally filmed in a manner that shows the entrance at an angle because the cave is actually a very short tunnel through the hill, with the rear opening easily visible in a direct shot.  The most well-known appearance of the tunnel entrance is likely its use as the entrance to the Batcave in the 1966–68 Batman television series.

Media filmed or set in the canyon

Films

 Lightning Bryce (1919)
 Riders of the Purple Sage (1925)
 The Lightning Warrior (1931)
 The Hurricane Express (1932)
 I Am a Fugitive from a Chain Gang (1932)
 White Zombie (1932)
 Sagebrush Trail (1933)
 The Three Musketeers (1933)
 The Vampire Bat (1933)
 Mystery Mountain (1934)
 The Phantom Empire (1935)
 Flash Gordon (1936)
 Robinson Crusoe of Clipper Island (1936)
 Zorro Rides Again (1937)
 Dick Tracy Returns (1938)
 Hawk of the Wilderness (1938)
 The Lone Ranger Rides Again (1939)
 Adventures of Captain Marvel (1941)
 Call of the Canyon (1942)
 Pirates of Monterey (1947)
 Silver River (1948)
 Atom Man vs. Superman (1949)
 Flame of Araby (1951)
 Unknown World (1951)
 Carson City (1952)
 Robot Monster (1953)
 Captain John Smith and Pocahontas (1953) 
 Killers from Space (1954)
 Massacre Canyon (1954)
 Day the World Ended (1955) 
 Crashout (1955)
 Invasion of the Body Snatchers (1956)
 The Lone Ranger (1956)
 It Conquered the World (1956)
 The Searchers (1956)
 Men in War (1957)
 The Brain from Planet Arous (1957)
 The Cyclops (1957)
 Attack of the Crab Monsters (1957)
 The Bride and the Beast (1958)
 Earth vs. the Spider (1958)
 Monster from Green Hell (1958)
 The Return of Dracula (1958)
 Teenage Caveman (1958)
 Night of the Blood Beast (1958)
 The Jayhawkers! (1959)
 Invisible Invaders (1959)
 Teenagers from Outer Space (1959)
 The Cape Canaveral Monsters (1960)
 Eegah (1962)
 Invasion of the Star Creatures (1962)
 The Magic Sword (1962)
 Ride the High Country (1962)
 The Gun Hawk (1963)
 They Saved Hitler's Brain (Madmen of Mandoras) (1963)
 The Human Duplicators (1965)
 Batman: The Movie (1966)
 Mondo Bizarro (1966)
 Flaming Frontier (1968)
 Head (1968)
 The Mighty Gorga (1969)
 Equinox (1970)
 Octaman (1971)
 Zorgon: The H-Bomb Beast from Hell (1972)
 Lost Horizon (1973)
 Flesh Gordon (1974)
 The Human Tornado (1976)
 The Choirboys (1977)
 The White Buffalo (1977) 
 Raise the Titanic (1980)
 The Return (1980)
 The Legend of the Lone Ranger (1981)
 The Sword and the Sorcerer (1982)
 Dreamscape (1984)
 The Evil That Men Do (1984)
 Friday the 13th Part VI: Jason Lives (1986)
 Thrashin' (1986)
 Munchies (1987)
 Blood Diner (1987)
 The Wizard of Speed and Time (1989)
 Star Trek VI: The Undiscovered Country (1991)
 The Roller Blade Seven (1991)
 Army of Darkness (1992)
 Guns of El Chupacabra (1997)
 La Cucaracha (1998)
 George of the Jungle (1997)
 The End of Violence (1997)
 The Lost Skeleton of Cadavra (2001)
 Cabin Fever (2002)
 Fangs (2002)
 The Scorpion King (2002)
 Return to the Batcave: The Misadventures of Adam and Burt (2003)
 Tremors 4: The Legend Begins (2004)
 Vampire Blvd. (2004)
 Diabolical Tales (2007)
 D-War (2007)
 Princess of Mars (2009)
 Mega Python vs. Gatoroid (2010)
 Mega Shark Versus Crocosaurus (2010)
 The Whisperer in Darkness (2011)
 Baseball's Last Hero: 21 Clemente Stories (2013)
 B.C. Butcher (2016)
 Hail, Caesar! (2016)
 Time Trap (2017)
 Under the Silver Lake (2018)
 Palm Springs (2020)

TV series

 The A-Team
 The Adventures of Brisco County, Jr.
 The Adventures of Rin Tin Tin
 Alias Smith and Jones
 Bat Masterson
 Batman
 Beauty and the Geek
 Bonanza
 Cannon ("The Set Up" E92)
 Combat!
 Crazy like a fox ("fox in wonderland")
 The Dukes of Hazzard ("Hazzard Connection")
 Falcon Crest
 Gunsmoke
 Have Gun – Will Travel
 Iron Horse ("The Man from New Chicago" S01E10)
 The Last Ship
 Little House on the Prairie
 The Lone Ranger
 Mighty Morphin Power Rangers
 Mission: Impossible (1960s)
 The Monkees
 The Outer Limits (1960s)
 Perry Mason (1960s)
 Rawhide
 Salute Your Shorts ("Clan of the Cavegirls" S02E11)
 Star Trek: Deep Space Nine
 Star Trek: Enterprise
 Star Trek: The Next Generation
 Star Trek: The Original Series
 Star Trek: Voyager
 Tombstone Territory 
 Twin Peaks
 V
 The Virginian
 The Wild Wild West ("Night of the Returning Dead" S02E05)
 Wonder Woman

Novels
 Lost Light by Michael Connelly

Music Videos
 t.A.T.u. "Friend or Foe" October 2005
 Modern World, Collapsing Scenery (2018)
 More Dead, Death Valley Girls (2018)
 Easier, 5 Seconds of Summer (2019)
 Til The Light Goes Out, Lindsey Stirling (2020)
 "Queen of the Broken Hearts"- Loverboy (1983)

See also

Vasquez Rocks, another Los Angeles County landmark used as a location in numerous films and television episodes

References

External links
Bronson Canyon in the Movies
List of 101 movies that used Bronson Canyon
Bronson Canyon - Representing the divine on earth

Canyons and gorges of California
Landmarks in Los Angeles
Griffith Park
Landforms of Los Angeles County, California